Oleksandr Tomakh (born 17 January 1993) is a Ukrainian football defender.

Career
Tomakh was born in a family with a strong football tradition - he is a grandson of Oleksandr Tomakh. He  is a product of the FC Dynamo Zaporizhya and Shakhtar Donetsk youth sportive schools and signed a contract with FC Arsenal Kyiv in the Ukrainian Premier League in 2010, but did not appear in any games for this team.

In January 2014 he signed a 1.5-years contract with NK Istra 1961. In 2015, he played overseas with Toronto Atomic FC in the Canadian Soccer League.

See also
 Oleksandr Tomakh (footballer born 1948)

References

External links
Profile at Official FFU Site (Ukr)

Ukrainian footballers
FC UkrAhroKom Holovkivka players
FC Dnister Ovidiopol players
Association football defenders
1993 births
Living people
Footballers from Zaporizhzhia
NK Istra 1961 players
NK Rovinj players
Croatian Football League players
Ukrainian expatriate footballers
Expatriate footballers in Croatia
Ukrainian expatriate sportspeople in Croatia
Toronto Atomic FC players
Canadian Soccer League (1998–present) players
Ukrainian First League players